Papi Chulo is an American-Irish comedy-drama film directed and written by John Butler, starring Matt Bomer and Alejandro Patiño. It premiered at the 2018 Toronto International Film Festival.

Plot 
Sean, a solitary and alienated television weatherman, drives past a middle-aged Hispanic migrant worker standing outside a hardware store looking for work. He decides to hire this kind-looking man, to paint his deck and for someone to talk to, in this darkly comedic reflection on class, ethnicity, and companionship in contemporary Los Angeles. Sean is young, gay and white; Ernesto, portly, straight and married. Despite having nothing in common and the language barrier, they build a sort of friendship, until Sean becomes consumed with a deeper obsessive need.

Cast 
 Matt Bomer as Sean
 Alejandro Patiño as Ernesto
 Elena Campbell-Martinez as Linda
 Wendi McLendon-Covey as Ash
 Michael Shepperd as Stan
 Tommie Earl Jenkins as Tom
 Edgar Arreola as Elisio
 Ryan Guzman as Rodrigo
 Shaughn Buchholz as Mike
 D'Arcy Carden as Susan

Release  
Papi Chulo had its world premiere at the Toronto International Film Festival on September 8, 2018. The film also screened at BFI London Film Festival; the Torino Film Festival on November 23, 2018; the Palm Springs International Film Festival on January 6, 2019; and the Dublin International Film Festival on February 20, 2019. It then released in select theaters on June 7, 2019.

Reception

Critical response 
The site's consensus reads: "Papi Chulo is a cross-cultural comedy that mostly avoids the pitfalls of its premise, largely thanks to the chemistry between its well-matched leads." Another aggregator, Metacritic, gave the film a score of 42 out of 100, based on 11 critics, indicating "mixed or average reviews".

Accolades

References

External links
 
 

2018 films
2018 comedy-drama films
2010s English-language films
Films set in Ireland
Irish comedy-drama films
American LGBT-related films
LGBT-related comedy-drama films
American comedy-drama films
Irish LGBT-related films
2018 LGBT-related films
2010s American films